This page lists public opinion polls conducted for the 2024 Indonesian presidential election. Incumbent president Joko Widodo is ineligible to run for a third term.

Open

Polls graph

2023

2022

October 2020 – December 2021

January–September 2020

Head-to-head

Ganjar vs. Anies

Prabowo vs. Anies

Prabowo vs. Ganjar

Prabowo vs. RK

Prabowo vs. Khofifah

Prabowo vs. Puan

Prabowo vs. Airlangga

Prabowo vs. Nadiem

Prabowo vs. Erick

See also 
 Opinion polling for the 2024 Indonesian legislative election

References 

Indonesia
Presidential elections in Indonesia